An owner's manual (also called an instruction manual or a user guide) is an instructional book or booklet that is supplied with almost all technologically advanced consumer products such as vehicles, home appliances and computer peripherals.
Information contained in the owner's manual typically includes:
 Safety instructions; for liability reasons these can be extensive, often including warnings against performing operations that are ill-advised for product longevity or overall user safety reasons.
 Assembly instructions; for products that arrive in pieces for easier shipping.
 Installation instructions; for products that need to be installed in a home or workplace.
 Setup instructions; for devices that keep track of time or which maintain user accessible state.
 Instructions for normal or intended operations.
 Programming instructions; for microprocessor controlled products such as VCRs, programmable calculators, and synthesizers.
 Maintenance instructions.
 Troubleshooting instructions; for when the product does not work as expected.
 Service locations; for when the product requires repair by a factory authorized technician.
 Regulatory code compliance information; for example with respect to safety or electromagnetic interference.
 Product technical specifications.
 Warranty information; sometimes provided as a separate sheet.

Until the last decade or two of the twentieth century it was common for an owner's manual to include detailed repair information, such as a circuit diagram; however as products became more complex this information was gradually relegated to specialized service manuals, or dispensed with entirely, as devices became too inexpensive to be economically repaired.

Owner's manuals for simpler devices are often multilingual so that the same boxed product can be sold in many different markets. Sometimes the same manual is shipped with a range of related products so the manual will contain a number of sections that apply only to some particular model in the product range.

With the increasing complexity of modern devices, many owner's manuals have become so large that a separate quickstart guide is provided. Some owner's manuals for computer equipment are supplied on CD-ROM to cut down on manufacturing costs, since the owner is assumed to have a computer able to read the CD-ROM. Another trend is to supply instructional video material with the product, such as a videotape or DVD, along with the owner's manual.

Many businesses offer PDF copies of manuals that can be accessed or downloaded free of charge from their websites.

Installation manual 
An installation manual or installation guide is a technical communication document intended to instruct people how to install a particular product. An installation manual is usually written by a technical writer or other technical staff. 

Installation is the act of putting something in place so that it is ready for use. An installation manual most commonly describes the safe and correct installation of a product. The term product here relates to any consumer, non-consumer, hardware, software, electrical, electronic or mechanical product that requires installation. The installation of a computer program is also known as the setup.

In case of an installation manual, the installation instruction is a separate document that focuses solely on the person(s) that will perform the installation. However, the installation instruction can also be an integrated part of the overall owner's manual.

The size, structure and content of an installation manual depend heavily on the nature of the product and the needs and capabilities of the intended target group. Furthermore, various standards and directives are available that provide guidance and requirements for the design of instructions.

The international standard IEC 82079 prescribes the required installation topics for an installation instruction. Among these topics, are procedures, diagrams and conditions for installation activities, such as unpacking, mounting and connecting.

For machines the European Machinery Directive prescribes that an instruction manual must contain assembly, installation and connecting instructions, including drawings, diagrams and the means of attachment and the designation of the chassis or installation on which the machinery is to be mounted.

Car owner's manuals 
All new cars come with an owner's manual from the manufacturer. Most owners leave them in the glove compartment for easy reference. This can make their frequent absence in rental cars frustrating because it violates the driver's user expectations, as well as makes it difficult to use controls that aren't understood, which is not good because understanding control operation of an unfamiliar car is one of the first steps recommended in defensive driving. Owner's manuals usually cover three main areas: a description of the location and operation of all controls; a schedule and descriptions of maintenance required, both by the owner and by a mechanic; and specifications such as oil and fuel capacity and part numbers of light bulbs used. Current car owner's manuals have become much bigger in part due to many safety warnings most likely designed to avoid product liability lawsuits, as well as from ever more complicated audio and navigational systems, which often have their own manual.

If owners lose their car manual, they can either order a replacement from a dealer, pick up a used one secondhand, or download a PDF version of the manual online.

In 2017, IBM released IBM Watson Artificial Intelligence to understand and answer questions in natural driver language. "Ask Mercedes" was the first in a wave of these vehicle assistants which can support both speech and text-based input.

Popular culture 
The noun phrase owner's manual has been used by analogy in the title of numerous instructional books about entities that are not manufactured products, such as pets, body parts and businesses.

User guides 
The equivalent document for computer software is called a user guide since users are typically licensees rather than owners of the software.

Unicode 
The OPEN BOOK (📖) Unicode symbol equals read operator's manual. OPEN BOOK has Unicode code point U+1F4D6.

References

External links 
 

Documents
Technical communication